Isostola flavicollaris is a moth of the family Erebidae. It was described by Hering in 1925. It is found in Panama.

References

Arctiinae
Moths described in 1925